Stranger in Us All is the eighth and most recent studio album by the British hard rock band Rainbow, released in 1995. Guitarist Ritchie Blackmore put together a new line-up of members of little-known musicians in 1994. The album was originally intended to be his solo album, but due to pressures from BMG, it was billed as Ritchie Blackmore's Rainbow, making Stranger in Us All the band's first studio album in twelve years. As Blackmore decided to pursue different musical styles (forming Blackmore's Night with his companion Candice Night), this was his final recording as a rock artist for two decades, until he put together a reincarnation of Rainbow in 2016 and released a series of new singles. The album takes its name from a line in the song "Black Masquerade".

Released in the post-grunge mid-1990s, "Stranger in Us All" failed to measure up to the critical and commercial acclaim of previous releases and was not particularly well publicized. However, it achieved a modest success, particularly in Europe and Japan.

Promotion
Much of the album was featured in the live concert sets. Drummer John O'Reilly was replaced for the tour by the returning Chuck Burgi. John Miceli joined the band for the U.S. shows, from February to May 1997, plus one in Denmark. A live performance recorded at Philipshalle Düsseldorf for German TV show Rockpalast on October 9, 1995 was released on the DVD Black Masquerade in 2013.

A few songs off the album were played live by the band Over the Rainbow in 2008 and 2009, as the line-up featured Greg Smith and Paul Morris, who played in Rainbow in 1995.

The songs have been also performed occasionally by Doogie White, for example in 2004 with a band called White Noise, and 2010 presentations with Rata Blanca. An official DVD recording of White Noise titled In the Hall of the Mountain King was released in 2004. The song "Ariel" was performed live by Blackmore's Night on their 2007 Paris Moon tour.

Track listing

Track 10 was originally recorded by The Yardbirds on the album Having a Rave Up with The Yardbirds. The song was previously covered as an instrumental by the Dio-era Rainbow on Ritchie Blackmore's Rainbow and with vocals on Rainbow on Stage and other live albums.

Personnel
Rainbow
Doogie White - lead and backing vocals
Ritchie Blackmore - guitar, producer
Greg Smith - bass, backing vocals
Paul Morris - keyboards
John O'Reilly - drums

Additional musicians
Candice Night - backing vocals
Mitch Weiss - harmonica

Production
 Pat Regan - producer, engineer, mixing
 Fran Flannery, Jesse Henderson, Ed Miller, Steve Moseley, John Reigart, David Shackney, Steve Sisco and Dug - assistant engineers
 Vlado Meller - mastering at Sony Music Studios, New York

Charts

Certifications

References

External links
Heavy Harmonies page

1995 albums
Rainbow (rock band) albums
RCA Records albums